In mathematics a cocycle is a closed cochain.  Cocycles are used in algebraic topology to express obstructions (for example, to integrating a differential equation on a closed manifold).  They are likewise used in group cohomology.  In autonomous dynamical systems, cocycles are used to describe particular kinds of map, as in the Oseledets theorem.

See also
 Čech cohomology
 Cocycle condition

References

Algebraic topology
Cohomology theories
Dynamical systems